Yuxarı Bradi (also, Yukhary Burady) is a village in the Lerik Rayon of Azerbaijan.

References 

Populated places in Lerik District